Herbie Rides Again is a 1974 American comedy film directed by Robert Stevenson from a screenplay by Bill Walsh, based on a story by Gordon Buford. The film is the second installment in the Herbie film series and the sequel to The Love Bug (1968). It stars Helen Hayes, Stefanie Powers, Ken Berry, and Keenan Wynn reprising his villainous role as Alonzo P. Hawk (originated in the films The Absent-Minded Professor and Son of Flubber).

Herbie Rides Again was followed by Herbie Goes to Monte Carlo (1977).

Plot
Notorious real estate magnate and demolition baron Alonzo A. Hawk (Keenan Wynn) is ready to build his newest office building, the 130-story Hawk Plaza in San Francisco. His only obstacle is the 1892 firehouse inhabited by "Grandma" Steinmetz (Helen Hayes), widow of its former owner, Fire Captain Steinmetz, and aunt of mechanic Tennessee Steinmetz. Hawk's numerous attempts at evicting Mrs. Steinmetz have been unsuccessful, while the construction workers are growing impatient with Hawk's alleged indecision, reminding him that the whole thing is costing him $80,000 a day. Therefore, when Hawk's lawyer nephew Willoughby Whitfield (Ken Berry) comes to visit him, Hawk sends him to Mrs. Steinmetz.

Mrs. Steinmetz takes a liking to Willoughby due to his youthful looks and good manners, in contrast to Hawk's henchmen. She introduces him to Herbie the Love Bug explaining Tennessee is in Tibet, and his owner Jim Douglas is racing in Europe, as well as two other sentient machines: an early 20th-century orchestrion that plays on its own; and Old No. 22, a retired cable car. Steinmetz's neighbor Nicole (Stefanie Powers) punches Willoughby in the face due to his working for Hawk, but tries to make up to him by offering him a ride in Herbie. Herbie goes berserk after Willoughby insults him twice, eventually taking the two to a car version of a joust tournament, which Herbie wins. 

Later at a restaurant on Fisherman's Wharf, Nicole surprises Willboughy by telling him all the horrible things Hawk has done, including building a parking garage on the very same lot where Joe DiMaggio and his brothers learned to play baseball. Willoughby is upset about this and accidentally tells her that Hawk is his uncle, which enrages Nicole. She hits him with a boiled lobster in response, sending him splashing into the water below. Willoughby decides to sever all his ties with Hawk and initially tries to go home in disguise, but is convinced by Nicole to stay after she hears him criticize his uncle while talking to his mother on the telephone.

Meanwhile, Hawk decides to take it upon himself to drive Mrs. Steinmetz out, starting with stealing Herbie. Hawk is initially successful with his hotwiring skill, but also insults Herbie, who retaliates by causing a series of traffic collisions, and discards Hawk at his own office door. Later, while Herbie takes Mrs. Steinmetz to market, they are chased by Hawk's men; whereupon Herbie makes several daring escapes culminating in traveling through the 1909 landmark Sheraton Palace Hotel and along a suspension cable on the Golden Gate Bridge, with Mrs. Steinmetz oblivious throughout.

Mrs. Steinmetz asks Nicole and Willoughby to pick up some more groceries for her, and then suggests to Herbie to drive them to the beach. Willoughby and Nicole enjoy a romantic moment at the beach and begin to fall for each other, but Hawk's chauffeur, spying on Herbie and the duo, bribes a man to park his trailer on the only road out, prompting Herbie to surf through the coastal bay to find an alternate route.

When they return to the firehouse after dark, every item of furniture has been removed by Hawk. Mrs. Steinmetz, Willoughby, Nicole, and Herbie track the theft to Hawk's warehouse, where they break in and recover Mrs. Steinmetz's belongings, loaded into Old No. 22. Hawk's security guards catch them in the act, but Herbie traps them by pushing other items off the warehouse shelves. On the way home, Herbie and Old No. 22 are pursued by Hawk, and Mrs. Steinmetz meets and becomes enamoured with an inebriated old-timer named Judson, who resembles her late husband, Captain Steinmetz.

The next morning, Mrs. Steinmetz decides to confront Hawk herself. Accompanied by Willoughby, in spite of Nicole telling him not to let her, Mrs. Steinmetz drives Herbie onto the window-cleaning machine of Hawk’s skyscraper to reach his office, where they overhear Hawk on the phone with Loostgarten (Chuck McCann), an independent demolition agent, about a deal to demolish the firehouse. In response, she activates the window cleaning machine to fill the office with soap and water. Herbie then chases Hawk around the office, then outside onto a ledge of the building, until Mrs Steinmetz calms him down.

Disguising his voice to resemble his uncle's, Willoughby mis-directs Loostgarten to demolish Hawk's own house. Late that evening, Loostgarten telephones Hawk to confirm the demolition, waking Hawk from a nightmare showing himself at the mercy of Herbie; Hawk then gives confirmation, but realizes too late that he has condemned his own residence, and angrily berates Loostgarten after a portion of his house is demolished.

Hawk fakes a truce with Mrs. Steinmetz, and thinking him to be sincere, Willoughby and Nicole go for dinner, while Mrs. Steinmetz invites Judson to the firehouse for a date of their own. Hawk shows up with bulldozers and frontloaders to crush the firehouse and its inhabitants once and for all, prompting Herbie to go in search of Nicole and Willoughby. In the absence of Herbie, the only means of defense is an antique fire hose, which Judson uses against Hawk's men, until it bursts.

Finding Nicole and Willoughby, Herbie rounds up an army of other Volkswagen Beetles from around the city (including a wrecked one from a junkyard), and chase after Hawk and his men, taking advantage of Hawk's irrational fear of Herbie and causing his men to flee. Hawk, after nearly getting knocked down by a police car, is arrested after telling his bizarre tale of an army of Volkswagen Beetles chasing him. Nicole and Willoughby are married, and ride Herbie through an arch formed by his Volkswagen Beetle friends.

Cast

 Helen Hayes as Mrs. Steinmetz
 Ken Berry as Willoughby Whitfield
 Stefanie Powers as Nicole Harris Whitfield
 John McIntire as Mr. Judson
 Keenan Wynn as Alonzo P. Hawk
 Huntz Hall as Judge
 Ivor Barry as Maxwell - Chauffeur
 Vito Scotti as Taxi Driver
 Liam Dunn as Doctor
 Elaine Devry as Millicent - Secretary
 Chuck McCann as Fred Loostgarten
 Richard X. Slattery as Traffic Commissioner 
 Don Pedro Colley as Barnsdorf
 Larry J. Blake as Police Officer 
 Iggie Wolfington as Lawyer - Second Team 
 Jack Manning as Lawyer - First Team 
 Hal Baylor as Demolition Truck Driver
 Herb Vigran as Window Washer 
 Edward Ashley as Announcer at Chicken Race 
 Beverly Carter as Chicken Run Queen 
 Norm Grabowski as Security Guard #2
 Irwin Charone as Lawyer - Second Team
 Gail Bonney as Rich Woman in Mansion
 Burt Mustin as Rich Man in Mansion 
 John Myhers as Announcer at San Francisco's Office of the President 
 John Stephenson as Lawyer - Second Team 
 Robert Carson as Lawyer - First Team
Raymond Bailey as Lawyer - Second Team
 Arthur Space as Beach Caretaker
 John Hubbard as Angry Chauffeur
 Fritz Feld as Maitre d'
 Alvy Moore as Angry Taxi Driver
 Karl Lukas as Angry Construction Worker
 Paul Micale as Fisherman's Wharf Waiter
 John Zaremba as Lawyer - First Team
 Alan Carney as Judge with Cigar at Chicken Run
 Ken Sansom as Lawyer - First Team
 Maurice Marsac as French Waiter
 Hal Williams as Policeman writing Ticket

Production notes

Casting
Fritz Feld, who appears as the Maitre d', and Vito Scotti, who plays the Italian cab driver, also appear in the sequel Herbie Goes Bananas as crewmen of the ship Sun Princess. Dan Tobin, Raymond Bailey, Iggie Wolfington, Robert S. Carson, and John Zaremba played some of Hawk's attorneys; Disney regular Norman Grabowski played "Security guard #2;" John Myhers played the San Francisco's Office of the President announcer; and Alan Carney played a judge at the Chicken Tournament.

Deleted scenes
The GAF View-Master reel set for the film shows a still from a deleted sequence where one of Hawk's nightmares has him about to be treated by a pair of white VW Beetle doctors, who decide to "take his carburetor out and have a look at it".  As they approach Hawk, he is awakened by Loostgarten.

Vehicles
The Herbies used for the film consisted both of 1963 and 1965 Beetles.

The included 1965 models make for some continuity errors as the windows are larger on the 1965 cars.

One of the VW Beetles used in the deleted nightmare sequence (see above) was first used in The Love Bug as a stunt car during the El Dorado race (also used for interior filming). Many years after Herbie Rides Again, the car's red cross, mechanical arms, and eyeball headlights were removed and restored to their former appearance.

"World's Highest Building"
"Hawk Plaza" is shown as a shining, twin-tower 130-story San Francisco skyscraper touted as "The World's Highest Building". Coincidentally, The Towering Inferno, released six months later, featured "The Glass Tower," a shining, single-tower 138-story San Francisco skyscraper touted as "The Tallest Building in the World." In actuality, New York's twin towers of the World Trade Center, "The Tallest Buildings in the World" had officially opened in 1973, and Chicago's 108-story Sears Tower claimed that title in May 1974, just one month before Herbie Rides Again was released.

Release

Box office
Herbie Rides Again opened on June 6, 1974 in 2,178 theaters and 1,761 drive-in theaters. The film grossed $38,229,000 at the United States and Canada box office, generating Disney $17,500,000 in theatrical rentals. The film earned rentals of around $13,300,000 overseas, giving worldwide rentals of almost $31 million.

Home media
Herbie Rides Again was released on VHS on October 15, 1981, re-released on November 6, 1985,  January 5, 1992, October 28, 1994 and September 16, 1997. It was first released on DVD in Region 1 on May 4, 2004 and was re-released as a 2-DVD double feature set along with Herbie Goes to Monte Carlo on April 26, 2009. On September 2, 2012, Herbie Rides Again was re-released on DVD as part of Herbie: 4-Movie Collection along with The Love Bug, Herbie Goes to Monte Carlo and Herbie Goes Bananas. The film was released on Blu-ray Disc on December 16, 2014 as a Disney Movie Club exclusive title.

Reception
Vincent Canby of The New York Times wrote, "There's nothing harmful about 'Herbie Rides Again'; it's simply not very good." Variety reported, "It should prove gleeful enough for the kiddies, and at the short and sweet unspooling time of 88 minutes, painless pleasantry for adult chaperones as well." Charles Champlin of the Los Angeles Times wrote that the film "suffers from the slackening of freshness and invention which so often bedevils sequels ... Still, 'Herbie Rides Again' preserves the bright, unreal feeling of that special Disney world which more and more is a world to itself." Gene Siskel gave the film two-and-a-half stars out of four and called it "a surprisingly tolerable sequel."

Herbie Rides Again presently holds a score of 80% at Rotten Tomatoes based on 5 reviews.

See also

 List of American films of 1974

References

External links

 
 
 
 

1974 films
1970s sports comedy films
American sports comedy films
American children's films
American sequel films
2
Films directed by Robert Stevenson
Films produced by Bill Walsh (producer)
Films set in California
Films set in San Francisco
Films shot in San Francisco
Walt Disney Pictures films
Films about real estate holdout
Films scored by George Bruns
1974 comedy films
1970s English-language films
1970s American films